The 1928 Michigan State Spartans football team represented Michigan State College (MAC) as an independent during the 1928 college football season. In their first and only year under head coach Harry Kipke, the Spartans compiled a 3–4–1 record and outscored their opponents 153 to 66.

On September 29, in their first game under coach Kipke, the Spartans scored 103 points against , a total that was erroneously reported to be a school record. The team scored 39 points in the first half but scored at an even higher pace in the second half. The Spartans scored six touchdowns in the third quarter. Sophomore Carl Nordberg played quarterback, scored three touchdowns and was credited with running the team with precision and making several brilliant runs. Substitute halfback Max Crall scored four touchdowns, including long touchdown runs of 60 and 80 yards.

The game's only points were scored on a safety when Michigan State halfback Grove muffed a pass behind the goal line after trying to punt.

On November 17, the Spartans lost their annual rivalry game against Michigan by a 3–0 score in Ann Arbor.

In June 1929, Kipke was hired as the University of Michigan's new head coach. Upon being hired by Michigan, Kipke said, "Coaching Michigan is the greatest football job in America. I would be foolish to turn down such an offer. It has been one of my greatest ambitions in life."

Schedule

References

Michigan State
Michigan State Spartans football seasons
Michigan State Spartans football